Ustye is a rural locality (a village) in Vasilyevskoye Rural Settlement, Vashkinsky District, Vologda Oblast, Russia. The population was 13 as of 2002.

Geography 
Ustye is located 17 km east of Lipin Bor (the district's administrative centre) by road. Toropunino is the nearest rural locality.

References 

Rural localities in Vashkinsky District